The Patea by-election was a by-election in the New Zealand electorate of Patea, a rural seat on the west coast of the North Island.

Background
The by-election was held on 13 April 1921, and was precipitated by the resignation of sitting Reform member of parliament, Walter Powdrell. The Reform Party chose Edwin Dixon, the Mayor of Hawera, as their official candidate, and apparently Clutha Mackenzie was their second preference. Earlier, Thomas William McDonald announced his intention to stand for the Reform Party, however left without contesting the by-election.

Result
The following table gives the election results:

References

Patea 1921
1921 elections in New Zealand
Politics of Taranaki